Culpables (English title: Guilty) commonly refers to:

Films
 Culpables, 2001 Argentine miniseries.

Songs
 Culpables (Karol G and Anuel AA song), 2018 song by Karol G and Anuel AA.
 Culpables (Manuel Turizo song), 2018 song by Manuel Turizo.